John G. Slaney (born February 7, 1972) is a Canadian former professional ice hockey defenceman. He is an assistant coach for the Tucson Roadrunners. He was formerly the assistant coach of the Portland Pirates of the American Hockey League (AHL).

Playing career

He was drafted by the Washington Capitals in the first round, 9th overall in the 1990 NHL Entry Draft.

In the final game of the 1991 IIHF Junior World Championships, Slaney scored a tie-breaking third period goal for Canada versus the USSR, giving Canada the win in the game and the tournament.  The goal made him one of the most prominent names among Newfoundland sportspeople.

On December 30, 2005, Slaney became the all-time leading scorer among defencemen in AHL history with 454 points, a record he held until he was overtaken by Bryan Helmer in 2011.  Slaney then won the Calder Cup with the Philadelphia Phantoms of the AHL in 2005.

Records
 Until overtaken in 2011, was the all-time leading scorer among defencemen in AHL history

Career statistics

Regular season and playoffs

International

Awards and honours

Transactions
 July 12, 1995 – Traded to Colorado by Washington for Philadelphia's third round choice (previously acquired, Washington selected Shawn McNeil) in 1996 NHL Entry Draft
 December 28, 1995 – Traded to Los Angeles by Colorado for Winnipeg's sixth round choice (previously acquired, Colorado selected Brian Willsie) in 1996 NHL Entry Draft
 August 19, 1997 – Signed as a free agent by Phoenix
 June 26, 1998 – Claimed by Nashville from Phoenix in Expansion Draft
 September 30, 1999 – Signed as a free agent by Pittsburgh
 January 14, 2001 – Traded to Philadelphia by Pittsburgh for Kevin Stevens
 September 11, 2007 – Signed as a free agent by Kölner Haie
 May 5, 2008 – Signed as a free agent by Frankfurt Lions
 July 19, 2010 – Signed as a free agent by HC Plzeň

References

External links
 

1972 births
Living people
Arizona Coyotes coaches
Baltimore Skipjacks players
Canadian ice hockey defencemen
Colorado Avalanche players
Cornwall Aces players
Cornwall Royals (OHL) players
Frankfurt Lions players
HC Plzeň players
Ice hockey people from Newfoundland and Labrador
Kölner Haie players
Las Vegas Thunder players
Los Angeles Kings players
Milwaukee Admirals (IHL) players
Nashville Predators players
National Hockey League first-round draft picks
Philadelphia Flyers players
Philadelphia Phantoms players
Phoenix Coyotes players
Phoenix Roadrunners (IHL) players
Pittsburgh Penguins players
Portland Pirates players
Sportspeople from St. John's, Newfoundland and Labrador
Washington Capitals draft picks
Washington Capitals players
Wilkes-Barre/Scranton Penguins players
Canadian expatriate ice hockey players in the Czech Republic
Canadian expatriate ice hockey players in Germany
Canadian ice hockey coaches
Canadian expatriate ice hockey players in the United States